Immigration Football Club is a Malaysian professional football club based in Putrajaya, Federal Territories of Malaysia. They currently play in the second division in Malaysian football, the Malaysia M3 League. The club is also involved in the Malaysia FA Cup.

History
The club was founded in 2014 in Putrajaya, and participated in several competitions in Klang Valley. The club has also been involved in the KLFA Super League.

In 2019, the club get KLFA Super League runners-up spot and become eligible to compete in the Malaysia M3 League.

On 23 February 2020, the club competed in the Malaysia FA Cup for the first time and won the 1st round match 2–0 against Staroba FC. In the 2nd round they lost to Petaling Jaya City.

Season by season record

''Notes: 2020 season cancelled due to the COVID-19 pandemic, no promotion or league title was awarded.

Players
First-team squad

Management team
Club personnel
 Manager: Iqmal Haqimie Abdullah Head coach: Mat Zan Mat Aris Assistant coach :  Norhudahiroshi Razak  
 Goalkeeping coach: Mazlan Abdul Wahid
 Fitness coach:  Norhudahiroshi Razak  
 Physio: Nursuliana Mohd Sofian

Honours

Domestic competitions

League
 KLFA Super League
Runners-up: 2019

References

Malaysia M3 League
Football clubs in Malaysia